Mario Prada (born in Milan; died in 1958) was the founder and original designer of the fashion label Prada, a company specializing in many high fashion goods for men and women, including shoes, handbags, luggage, and leather goods. Prada was founded in 1913.

Founding of Prada

Prada was founded in 1913 by Mario Prada and his brother Martino as Fratelli Prada (English: Prada Brothers). The company was originally headquartered in Milan, Italy. The shop sold leather goods and imported English steamer trunks and handbags. Mario Prada did not believe that women should have a role in business, so he prevented female family members from entering into his company. Mario's son harboured no interest in the business, so it was Mario's daughter Luisa Prada who took the helm of Prada as his successor and ran it for almost twenty years. Her own daughter, Miuccia Prada, joined the company in 1970, eventually taking over for her mother in 1978.

See also
Prada
Miuccia Prada
Miu Miu
Prada Logo SVG - Unofficial

References

1958 deaths
Fashion designers from Milan
Year of birth missing
Prada